Alex Bein (Hebrew: אלכסנדר ביין) (born 21 January 1903; died 20 June 1988) was a German-Jewish historian and Zionist historiographer best known for his biography of Theodor Herzl.

Biography
Bein was born in Steinach an der Saale in Bavaria, southern Germany. He immigrated to Palestine in 1933. He was a resident of Jerusalem.He was director of the Central Zionist Archives and the first State Archivist of Israel. Bein died while on a visit to Stockholm.

Awards and recognition
Bein was awarded the Israel Prize in 1987 for his contribution to Zionist historiography.

Published works
Alex Bein (1980) Die Judenfrage : Biogr. e. Weltproblems (2 volumes) Stuttgart : Deutsche Verlags-Anstalt
Alex Bein, Harry Zohn (translator) (1990) "The Jewish Question: Biography of a World Problem", 
Alex Bein (1952) "The Return to the Soil: a History of Jewish Settlement in Israel" (Translated from the Hebrew by Israel Schen)
Alex Bein (1949) "Israel's Charter of Freedom"
Aleks Bain (1945) Toldot ha-hityashvut ha-Tsiyonit mi-teḳufat Hertsl ṿe-ʻad yamenu
Alex Bein (1939) "Der Zionismus und sein Werk" 
Alex Bein (1934) "Theodor Herzl; Biographie. mit 63 Bildern und einer Ahnentafel."
Alex Bein, Maurice Samuel (translator), (1941) "Theodore  Herzl: A Biography of the Founder of the Modern Zionism"

See also 
List of Israel Prize recipients

References

External links
The personal papers of Alex Bein are kept at the   Central Zionist Archives in Jerusalem. The notation of the record group is P64
 
 

Jewish scholars
1903 births
1988 deaths
Israeli archivists
People from Jerusalem
Israel Prize in Zionist historiography recipients
Jewish emigrants from Nazi Germany to Mandatory Palestine